The 1949–50 season was the 70th season of competitive football in England.

Overview
Portsmouth retained the First Division title by one of the narrowest margins in history ahead of Wolverhampton Wanderers F.C.

An event that was much talked about in the city of Sheffield for many years was the way the promotion race from the Second Division was won.  Going into the last game of the season, Sheffield Wednesday needed to beat Tottenham Hotspur to clinch promotion at the expense of their local rivals Sheffield United.  The resulting 0–0 draw meant Wednesday won promotion by a goal average difference of just 0.008 – a 1–1 draw would have left the two great rivals level on points and goal average, and a unique play-off match would have had to be played.

Joe Mercer captained the winning Arsenal team in the FA Cup and was named FWA Footballer of the Year.

Manchester United returned to a rebuilt Old Trafford eight years after it had been damaged by the Luftwaffe, but failed to win any silverware this season.

Honours

Notes = Number in parentheses is the times that club has won that honour. * indicates new record for competition

Football League

First Division

Second Division

Third Division North

Third Division South

Top goalscorers

First Division
Dickie Davis (Sunderland) – 25 goals

Second Division
Tommy Briggs (Grimsby Town) – 35 goals

Third Division North
Reg Philips (Crewe Alexandra) and Peter Doherty (Doncaster Rovers) – 26 goals

Third Division South
Tommy Lawton (Notts County) – 31 goals

References